The false ark shells (Cucullaea) are a small genus of marine bivalve molluscs related to the ark clams. The genus is the only member of the family Cucullaeidae.

Species
The World Register of Marine Species lists the following species:
†Cucullaea elegans (Fischer)
†Cucullaea gigantea Conrad, 1862 
Cucullaea granulosa Jonas, 1846 
Cucullaea labiata Lightfoot, 1786) 
Cucullaea petita Iredale, 1939 
Cucullaea vaga Iredale, 1930

References

Cucullaeidae